The Olimpia Awards are Argentine sports awards given annually by the  (Association of Sports Journalists) since 1954. 
An  (Silver Olimpia) is awarded to the outstanding performer in 41 sports. 

Each trophy consists of a statue designed by sculptor Mario Chiérico.

History 
The first  was given to the racing car driver Juan Manuel Fangio on 3 December 1954 at the Luna Park stadium in Buenos Aires, and the first woman to receive the award was the tennis player Norma Baylon in 1962. Other women to win the  individually were the tennis player Gabriela Sabatini in 1987 and 1988, the roller skaters Nora Vega in 1995 and Andrea Noemí González in 1998, the field hockey players Cecilia Rognoni in 2002 and Luciana Aymar in 2010, the judoka Paula Pareto in 2015 and the swimmer Delfina Pignatiello in 2017.

The boxer Santos Laciar is the only person to receive 3 consecutive , in 1982, 1983 and 1984, due to his conquering and retaining of the world flyweight title. The tennis player Guillermo Vilas also received 3 , in 1974, 1975 and 1977 and  Lionel Messi in 2011, 2021 and 2022. The only other people with consecutive  are Gabriela Sabatini and the basketball player Manu Ginóbili, who won the award by himself in 2003 and shared it in 2004.

The  has only been shared twice in its history: in 2004, when Manu Ginóbili shared the honor with association football player Carlos Tevez and in 2008, when the award was bestowed on cyclists Juan Curuchet and Walter Pérez. The only  (Platinum Olimpia) was awarded at the end of the 20th century to Maradona as "the best sportsperson of the century".

Olimpia de Plata categories
The Olimpia de Plata is awarded to the outstanding performer in each of the following sports:

 Association football 
 Athletics
 Auto racing
 Basketball
 Basque pelota
 Bocce
 Boxing
 Canoeing
 Cestoball
 Chess
 Cue sports
 Cycling
 Equestrianism
 Fencing
 Field hockey
 Futsal
 Golf
 Gymnastics
 Handball
 Horse racing
 Judo
 Motorcycling
 Padel tennis
 Paralympic sports
 Pato
 Polo
 Roller hockey
 Rowing
 Rugby union
 Shooting
 Skating
 Skiing
 Softball
 Squash
 Swimming
 Table tennis
 Taekwondo
 Tennis
 Volleyball
 Weightlifting
 Wrestling
 Yachting

winners 
The following is a list of winners since the Olimpia was first awarded in 1954:

See also
 Argentine Footballer of the Year (Olimpia de Plata award)

References

External links 
 

Sport in Argentina
Arg
Argentine awards
Awards established in 1954
1954 establishments in Argentina